Annapolis Convention may refer to:

Annapolis Convention (1774–1776), the Revolutionary War government of Maryland
Annapolis Convention (1786), which led to the Philadelphia Constitutional Convention of 1787

See also
Annapolis Conference, a Middle East peace conference which took place in 2007